Balloon Man is the debut album by English saxophonist Iain Ballamy, with Django Bates, Steve Watts and Martin France. It was released on the EG label in 1989.

Reception
AllMusic awarded the album with 4.5 out of 5 stars. The Penguin Guide review says: "Although closely associated with the Loose Tubes big band, his debut as a leader suggests that he is very much his own man. Rather than pursuing a particular style on one of the saxophones, he plays with a light-toned fluency on both alto and tenor; and instead of featuring himself, he prefers to work closely with his comrade Bates – many of the tracks here are almost like contrapuntal duets with rhythm accompaniment".

Track listing
All compositions by Iain Ballamy except where noted.
 "Mode Forbode" – 4:41
 "Remember..." – 7:25
 "Rahsaan" – 4:14
 "Strawberries" – 6:58
 "Albert" – 6:05
 "Balloon Man" – 4:46
 "Jumble Sale" – 2:50
 "All I Ask of You" (Gregory Norbet) – 7:41

Personnel
Iain Ballamy – soprano, alto and tenor saxophones 
Django Bates – keyboards, tenor horn on "Albert"
Steve Watts – bass
Martin France – drums

References

1989 albums
Iain Ballamy albums
E.G. Records albums